Hawthorn or Hawthorns may refer to:

Plants 
 Crataegus (hawthorn), a large genus of shrubs and trees in the family Rosaceae
 Rhaphiolepis (hawthorn), a genus of about 15 species of evergreen shrubs and small trees in the family Rosaceae
 Hawthorn maple, Acer crataegifolium, a tree variously classified in families Sapindaceae or Aceraceae
 Crataegus monogyna the  common hawthorn, the species after which the above are named

Places 
Hawthorn, Pennsylvania, a city in the United States
Hawthorn, Victoria, a suburb of Melbourne, Australia
Hawthorn railway station, Melbourne in the above suburb
Electoral district of Hawthorn, a Victorian Legislative Assembly seat based on and named after the above suburb
Hawthorn, South Australia, a suburb of Adelaide, Australia
Mount Hawthorn, Western Australia, a suburb of Perth, Australia
The Hawthorns, the stadium for the West Bromwich Albion F.C. in England
The Hawthorns station, a train and metro station that serves the ground
Hawthorn, County Durham, a village in County Durham, in England
Hawthorn, Wiltshire, a locality of Corsham, Wiltshire, England
Hawthorn, Hampshire, a village in Hampshire, in England
Hawthorns, Staffordshire, a village in Staffordshire, in England
Hawthorn (Rhondda Cynon Taf), a village in Rhondda Cynon Taf, in Wales
The Hawthorns (University of Bristol), a student residence at the university of Bristol

Other 
Hawthorn Leslie and Company, a British shipbuilder usually referred to as "Hawthorn" and located in Newcastle upon Tyne
Mike Hawthorn, English racing driver, 1958 F-1 World Champion
Hawthorn Football Club, the Hawthorn Hawks are an Australian rules football club
Hawthorn Suites, a hotel chain in the United States
Hawthorn Hall, a former house in Hall Road, Wilmslow, Cheshire
Hawthorn, an Irish rock band from Dublin

See also
Hawthorne (disambiguation)
Haw (disambiguation)